Ubida holomochla is a moth in the family Crambidae. It was described by Turner in 1904. It is found in Australia, where it has been recorded from Queensland and the Northern Territory.

The forewings are white with dark brown stripes. The hindwings are white.

References

Crambinae
Moths described in 1904